Kyrgyzstan sent a delegation to compete at the 2008 Summer Paralympics in Beijing, People's Republic of China. The only recorded athlete was powerlifter Roman Omurbekov.

Powerlifting

Men

See also
Kyrgyzstan at the Paralympics
Kyrgyzstan at the 2008 Summer Olympics

External links
International Paralympic Committee

References

Nations at the 2008 Summer Paralympics
2008
Summer Paralympics